Mahre is a surname. Notable people with the surname include:

Phil Mahre (born 1957), American alpine skier
Steve Mahre (born 1957), American alpine skier

See also
Jahre
Maher (surname)
Mahrez